Polar Ice is a Canadian vodka produced by Corby Distilleries Ltd. Produced from Canadian corn, it is quadruple distilled, which vendors claim rids the vodka of microscopic impurities and gives vodka a smoother taste. The vodka is an eighty proof spirit. Polar Ice Vodka has several products in various sizes and formats (plastic and glass). The brand line includes Polar Ice Vodka (40% alc./vol), Polar Ice Vodka Arctic Extreme (45% alc./vol) and Polar Ice Vodka Ontario Peach. Polar Ice Vodka is available across Canada and in some cities in the United States of America.

Awards
San Francisco World Spirits Competition
2015: Gold Medal - Polar Ice Vodka 
2017: Double Gold Metal - Polar Ice 90 North Vodka  Silver Medal - Polar Ice Vodka 
2018: Double Gold Medal - Polar Ice Arctic Extreme Vodka 
2019: Double Gold Medal - Polar Ice Arctic Extreme Vodka

International Wine & Spirit Competition 
2017: Silver – Polar Ice Vodka  Silver Outstanding - Polar Ice 90 North Vodka 
2018: Silver Outstanding - Polar Ice Arctic Extreme Vodka Silver - Flavored Vodka - Polar Ice Ontario Peach Vodka  Silver - Polar Ice Vodka 

International Spirits Challenge
2017: Silver- Polar Ice 90 North 
2018: Silver - Polar Ice Vodka 

SIP Awards
2017: Platinum - Polar Ice 90* North  Silver - Polar Ice 
2018: Consumer Choice Award – Polar Ice Vodka  Silver - Polar Ice Vodka  Gold - Polar Ice Arctic Extreme 

The Spirit Business: Global Vodka Masters
2017: Master - Polar Ice 90° North  Gold - Polar Ice Vodka 
2018: Silver - Polar Ice Vodka  Gold - Polar Ice Arctic Extreme  Gold – Polar Ice Peach

References

Canadian brands
Canadian vodkas